Van der Lans or VanderLans is a Dutch toponymic surname, literally meaning "from the lance", but probably referring to a location named De Lans. Notable people with the surname include:

Brigitte van der Lans (born 1968), Dutch backstroke swimmer
Jan van der Lans (1933–2002), Dutch psychologist
Jos van der Lans (born 1954), Dutch journalist, writer and politician
Piet van der Lans (born 1940), Dutch Olympic cyclist
Rudy VanderLans (born 1955), Dutch graphic designer and typographer
Olav van der Lans (born 1992), Dutch marketeer

See also
Lans (disambiguation)

References

Dutch-language surnames
Surnames of Dutch origin
Dutch toponymic surnames